HD 45652 is a star with an exoplanetary companion in the equatorial constellation of Monoceros. It was officially named Lusitânia on 17 December 2019, after the IAU100 press conference in Paris by the IAU (International Astronomical Union). This star has an apparent visual magnitude of 8.10, making it an 8th magnitude star that is too dim to be visible to the naked eye. The system is located at a distance of 114 light-years from the Sun based on parallax measurements, but is drifting closer with a radial velocity of −5 km/s.

The measured atmospheric properties match a metal-rich late G- or early K-type dwarf star. It is a middle-aged main sequence star, about five billion years old, and is chromospherically inactive. The star is smaller and less massive than the Sun. It is radiating 61% of the Sun's luminosity from its photosphere at an effective temperature of 5,342 K. HD 45652 is spinning with a projected rotational velocity of 3.5 km/s.

In May 2008, the discovery of an extrasolar planet, HD 45652 b, orbiting the star was announced. The planet was detected by the radial velocity method, using observations made from 2005 to 2007. It has been assigned the name Viriato by the IAU Division C Working Group on Star Names.

References

External links
 
 

G-type main-sequence stars
K-type main-sequence stars
Planetary systems with one confirmed planet

Monoceros (constellation)
Durchmusterung objects
045652
030905